Chris Jörg Löwe (born 16 April 1989) is a German professional footballer who plays at left-back for Chemnitzer FC.

Career

Chemnitzer FC
Löwe began his career in the youth of 1. FC Wacker Plauen and Chemnitzer FC and was subsequently promoted to the first team in the 2007–08 season.

Borussia Dortmund
Löwe was sold to Borussia Dortmund for €200,000 and signed a four-year contract. Löwe earned his first competitive appearance for Dortmund in the 2011 DFL-Supercup against rivals FC Schalke 04 on 23 July 2011. In the club's league opener on 5 August 2011, Löwe started in the back four helping his side to a 3–1 victory over HSV.

1. FC Kaiserslautern
In 2013, Löwe was sold to 1. FC Kaiserslautern for €500,000 and signed a contract that will last to 2016.

Huddersfield Town
In 2016, Löwe signed a pre-contract agreement with Huddersfield Town on a 3-year deal, having been out of contract in the summer at 1. FC Kaiserslautern. He made his debut for the Terriers in their 2–1 win over Brentford on 6 August 2016. Löwe scored his first goal for Huddersfield scoring the opener in a 2–1 win over Barnsley on 20 August 2016. Löwe helped Huddersfield progress to the Championship Playoff Final in a penalty shoot out against Sheffield Wednesday   in a 4–3 win as the tie ended 1–1 on aggregate on 17 May 2017. He then went on to score in the penalty shootout against Reading FC at Wembley Stadium which resulted in a 4–3 win after drawing 0–0 in 120 minutes, gaining Huddersfield promotion to the Premier League on 29 May 2017.

Dynamo Dresden
On 24 May 2019, Löwe agreed a transfer to Dynamo Dresden for an undisclosed fee.

Career statistics

Honours
Borussia Dortmund
Bundesliga: 2011–12
DFB-Pokal: 2011–12

Huddersfield Town
EFL Championship play-offs: 2017

References

External links
 
 
 

1989 births
Living people
People from Plauen
People from Bezirk Karl-Marx-Stadt
German footballers
Footballers from Saxony
Association football fullbacks
Bundesliga players
2. Bundesliga players
3. Liga players
Huddersfield Town A.F.C. players
English Football League players
Premier League players
Chemnitzer FC players
Borussia Dortmund players
Borussia Dortmund II players
1. FC Kaiserslautern players
Dynamo Dresden players
German expatriate footballers
German expatriate sportspeople in England
Expatriate footballers in England